Misima (formerly called St. Aignan) is a volcanic island in the northwest of  Louisiade Archipelago within Milne Bay Province of Papua New Guinea.

History 
Misima Island was inhabited by Austronesians since about 1500 BC. The island was sighted in 1768 by French captain Louis Antoine de Bougainville and explored 1793 by French explorer Antoine Bruni d'Entrecasteaux.
Misima island owes its name to Élisabeth-Paul-Édouard de Rossel, which was a lieutenant of the Counter admiral Antoine Bruny d'Entrecasteaux during his journey of scientific exploration.
In 1888 the British Empire annexed Misima Island, and it became part of British New Guinea (since 1904 - the Territory of Papua administered by Australia).

Gold was discovered on Misima late in 1888. By March 1889, eighty men were on the island digging for gold, and a storekeeper had set up a business.

Since 1975, Misima belongs to the independent state of Papua New Guinea.
A gold and silver mine was opened on the island in 1990, by an international corporation. 
The mines provided plenty of work for the islanders. however, that mine was officially closed in 2004, because of excessive load on the environment and public health hazards.

Politics 

The island is within the Samarai Murua District.

Geography 

The island measures 40 km by 10 km and has an area of 214,5 km². It is located some 20 km north of the northwest extreme of the barrier reef of Vanatinai at Isu Raua Raua Island, and 80 km northwest of Vanatinai Island itself.

Misima is mountainous and densely forested. Mt. Koia Tau, at a height of 1,036 meters, is the highest peak of the Louisiade Archipelago.

It was not until 24 December 2016 when Kolbe Bare, a Papua New Guinean geologist, and two Misimans, David Kaliton and Kaliton Ada, made the first recorded ascent to the Top of Oia Tau.[4] It was noted by Kolbe that even though the mountain is close to the sea, Higher altitude vegetation covers the top of the mountain at the time of ascent.

Climate 

The local climate is tropical, moderated by northeast trade winds, with a dry season from 1 December to 31 May, and a wet season from 1 June to 30 November. it is usually very humid. Since it is fairly close to the equator, the temperature does not fluctuate much between winter and summer.

Economy 

Misima island is known as a mining island. A huge mine operated many years on the island. The mine was a joint venture by Placer Dome Inc (owning 80%) and the state-owned Orogen Minerals Ltd. In March 2012 Barrick closed its post closure monitoring office in Bwagaoia having successfully rehabilitated the mine and mill sites.

Since 2004 when the mine closed, artisanal mining has become a major source of income in the island, with an association Misima Alluvial Gold Mining Association (MAGMA) starting in 2007. Other sources of income, especially for people living on the north coast, are cash crops of coconuts, copra, and cacao. A commercial fisheries project has been proposed, but has not been developed yet.

Demographics 

The island has a population of 19,330, spread across 78 villages, Misima is the most heavily populated island in the Louisiade Archipelago. By area, it is the third largest, after Vanatinai and Rossel Island.
Since the mines have closed, there are signs of population decrease. people are moving to Alotau for jobs.

Urbanization 

The main town of the island and the seat of the district is Bwagaoia, located on the southeast corner of the island. Other villages are Hinauta, Boiou, Gulewa, Bagilina, Liak, Siagara, Eiaus (on the eastern north coast, reachable by road from Bwagaoia), Gulewa and Ewena (on the western north coast), and Bwagabwaga, Gaibobo and Alhoga (on the south coast).

Cities

Religion 
About half the population identified themselves as members of a Christian church. see Religion in Papua New Guinea for more info.

Language 
The main language of the island is also called Misiman, though many residents speak English and also Tok Pisin as a third language.

Culture

Education

Transportation 
Misima has a working airport  (four flights weekly to the mainland (POM via Alotau) through Airlines of Papua New Guinea, and one charter run by Porgera Joint Venture, a high school (grades 7-12), a small market, a few small stores and a clinic/hospital, a post office,--all of which are located in Bwagaoia. There are ferries from Alotau which service Misima Island, costing around K100 and taking 17 hours.

Flora and fauna
The following mammals are present on Misima Island:
Polynesian rat (introduced)
Wild boar (introduced)
Eastern common cuscus
Sugar glider
Grassland rat
Eastern rat
Panniet naked-backed fruit bat
Island tube-nosed fruit bat
Small flying fox
Common blossom bat
Temminck's trident bat
Spurred roundleaf bat
Fawn leaf-nosed bat
Diadem leaf-nosed bat
Smaller horseshoe bat
Misima bat
Little bent-wing bat
Miniopterus macrocneme
Great bent-winged bat
Common bent-wing bat
Angulate pipistrelle

Other animals:
Copiula oxyrhina

References

External links
Mine Report
Misima Island News at MisimaIsland.com

Islands of Milne Bay Province
Louisiade Archipelago
Gold mines in Papua New Guinea